Kew Green Preparatory School is a non-denominational mixed preparatory school in Kew in the London Borough of Richmond upon Thames.

References

External links
 Kew College
 Profile on the ISC website

2004 establishments in England
Private co-educational schools in London
Private schools in the London Borough of Richmond upon Thames
Kew, London
Preparatory schools in London